El Mami Tetah (born 12 November 2001) is a Mauritanian professional footballer who plays as a winger for Bulgarian First League club Arda Kardzhali, on loan from Turkish Süper Lig club Alanyaspor.

Professional career
A youth product of the Mauritanian club ACS Ksar, Tetah transferred to the Turkish club Alanyaspor on 27 January 2021. He made his professional debut for Alanyaspor as a late sub in a 1–0 Süper Lig loss to Sivasspor on 4 December 2021.

International career
Tetah represented the Mauritania U20s at the 2021 Africa U-20 Cup of Nations.

References

External links
 

2001 births
Living people
People from Nouakchott-Sud Region
Mauritanian footballers
Mauritania under-20 international footballers
Alanyaspor footballers
Süper Lig players
Association football wingers
Mauritanian expatriate footballers
Mauritanian expatriate sportspeople in Turkey
Expatriate footballers in Turkey